Constant Dullaart (born Leiderdorp, 7 March 1979) is a Dutch conceptual artist, media artist, internet artist, and curator. His work is deeply connected to the Internet.

Biography 
Dullaart was born and raised in Leiderdorp in the Netherlands. He attended the Gerrit Rietveld Academy from 1997 to 2002, and the Rijksakademie van beeldende kunsten in the year 2007–2008. After his graduation in 1997 he settled as artist in Amsterdam. From 2010 to 2015 he lived in Berlin.

Dullaart drew some attention with his work series Jennifer in Paradise which "seeks to expose the technological structures that inform modern visual culture".

He is also known for distributing 2.5 million bought Instagram followers amongst a personal selection of active art-world Instagram accounts.

A 4 month long durational performance commissioned by Schirn Kunsthalle Frankfurt got the attention of several media outlets when Dullaart raised a virtual army of thousands of fake Facebook profiles, using the names of Hessian (soldier)s from the Hetrina archive of the Landesgeschichtliches Informationssystem Hessen.

Prix Net Art, 2015 
He was awarded the Prix Net Art in late 2015 with the following jury statement:

Works

Exhibitions (selection)
2019 
Profile Wars, Cirl.Art, ABN AMRO, Amsterdam
dull.lifeTM - hack, hustle, historicize, Upstream Gallery, Amsterdam
Link in Bio, Museum der Bildenden Künste, Leipzig 
Stadstriënnale Hasselt / Genk, Screen it, Hasselt
Uncanny Values, MAK, Vienna
Screen it! at Art Brussels, Brussels
Festival van de Controle, Cultuurcentrum Hasselt, Hasselt Behind the Screen, Kindl, Berlin
Influencers, Galerie Hussenot, Paris
2018 
Cultural Matter: Constant Dullaart, LIMA, Amsterdam
Constant Dullaart 100.000 Followers for Everyone, FOAM Museum, Amsterdam 
The Armory Show New York with Upstream Gallery
Strasbourg Biennale, Strasbourg, France 
Agency, Nome Gallery, Berlin
All I Know is What's on the Internet, The Photographers Gallery, London 
Algorithmic Superstructures, Impakt Festival, Utrecht
Berlin Zentrum der Netzkunst - Damals und Heute, Panke Gallery, Berlin 
I Was Raised On The Internet, Museum of Contemporary Art, Chicago  
When Facts don't Matter, Lismore Castle Arts, Lismore
From ZERO to 2018, Upstream Gallery, Amsterdam
2017
Electronic Superhighway, MAAT, Lisbon 
Open Codes, ZKM, Karlsruhe, Germany
Windows, Basel
Collecting Europe, Victoria & Albert Museum, London
How to Disappear Completely, Garage Rotterdam, Rotterdam 
Human/Digital: a Symbiotic Love Affair, Kunsthal Rotterdam, Rotterdam 
Transmediale, Berlin
2016 
Deep Epoch, Upstream Gallery, Amsterdam 
Future Gallery, Berlin, Germany
MU, Eindhoven, 
Smart Objects, Los Angeles
2015
The Possibility of an Army, Schirn Kunsthalle Frankfurt, Frankfurt, Germany  
Jennifer, Futura, Prague
Opening Time, London
Filter economy and quantified social capital, Dutch National Bank, Amsterdam 
ABC with Future Gallery, Berlin 
The Censored Internet, Aksioma, Ljubliana
2014  
High Retention Slow Delivery, Jeu de Paume-espace virtuel, Paris 
Stringendo, Vanishing Mediators, Carroll / Fletcher, London  
Brave New Panderers, XPO Gallery, Paris
2013 
Jennifer in Paradise, Future Gallery, Berlin  
Jennifer in Paradise, Import Projects, Berlin
2012
Onomatopoeia, Utah Museum of Contemporary Art, Salt Lake City 
HEALING, Fabio Paris Gallery, Brescia, Italy 
Treffpunkt Internet, speedshow, Berlin

References

External links

 Official website
 Jennifer in Photoshop, Constant Dullaart, 2014
 Official Prix Net Art website
 The possibility of an Army, Constant Dullaart 2016
 Mesodiplosis, Constant Dullaart 2015
 Chaos Computer Club Conference 32C3, talk, 2015

1979 births
Living people
Dutch conceptual artists
People from Leiderdorp